The comarca of Roussillon is a historical Catalan comarca of Northern Catalonia, now part of the French  department of Pyrénées-Orientales. Its capital is Perpignan (Catalan: Perpinyà).

Rosselló has an area of 1,498 km². In 1990, Rosselló had a population of 303,850 inhabitants, with a density of 202.8 people per km².

It comprises most of the historic county and province of Roussillon.

See also 
Counts of Roussillon

External links 
 El Rosselló in Catalan Encyclopaedia.

Geography of Pyrénées-Orientales